Mar Audishu V, (Ebed-Jesu V), Georges Khayyath  (or Abdisho V, Giwargis Hayyat) (Arabic: مار جرجيس عبد يشوع الخامس خياط) (October 15, 1827 – November 6, 1899) was the patriarch of the Chaldean Catholic Church from 1894 to his death in 1899. He was also an Aramaic-language scholar.

He is remembered also as editor of the Mosul Edition of the Chaldean Peshitta. He wrote a book titled Romanorum Pontificum Primatus.

Life
He was born on October 15, 1827, in Mossul. He studied in the Congregation for the Propagation of the Faith in Rome and was ordained priest in 1855. On 23 September 1860 he was ordained Bishop of Amadiyah, Iraq, by Patriarch Joseph Audo. He was the patriarchal vicar of Mossul from 1863 to 1870 and metropolitan of Amid from 1874 to 1894. He was appointed Patriarch of the Chaldean Church on October 28, 1894, and served till his death on November 6, 1899. He died and was buried at the church of Mary mother of sorrows in Baghdad, modern day Iraq. He replaced Patriarch Eliya XIV [XIII] Abulyonan and was followed by Yousef VI Emmanuel II Thomas.

Images

References

Sources
 
 

 

Iraqi archbishops
Chaldean Catholic Patriarchs of Babylon
1827 births
1899 deaths
People from Mosul
19th-century Eastern Catholic archbishops
Eastern Catholic bishops in the Ottoman Empire